On the diplomatic level, Colombia–Germany relations have existed since 1872 and thus for more than 140 years.

History 
The German conquistador Ambrosius Ehinger died at Chinácota in Colombia in 1533.

In 1889, Leo S. Kopp, a native of Offenbach, Germany, founded Sociedad Kopp's German Brewery, now known as Bavaria Brewery., the largest brewery in Colombia. In 1919, the German-Colombian Airline (Sociedad Colombo Alemana de Transportes/SCADTA) was founded as the second oldest airline in the world still in existence. Its successor, Avianca, is today the largest Colombian airline.

During World War II, Colombia – after massive pressure from the US – was one of the last Latin American countries to declare war on Germany on 27 November 1943. The declaration of war did not have military consequences, but it did allow for the confiscation of property from Germans.

After the war, relations were initially resumed as trade relations. In early 1949, the Bank deutscher Länder and the Colombian Central Bank agreed that Colombia would deliver coffee (worth US$4 million), bananas (worth US$3 million), and tobacco (worth US$2 million), among other goods, to the Trizone from 1 July 1949, to 30 June 1950, and that this was to be settled with the delivery of German machinery and vehicles.

According to the German Foreign Office, "friendly and increasingly close relations" have existed between the two countries for a long time.

Economic relations 
Bilateral trade volume in 2021 was 2.6 billion euros. This makes Germany the fifth-largest trading partner for Colombia and the largest within the EU. A free trade agreement between Colombia and the EU has been in place since 2013.

German Colombians 

Famous German Colombians include:

 Ambrosius Ehinger
 Nikolaus Federmann
 Carlos Ardila Lülle
 Rudolf Hommes
 Aura Cristina Geithner
 Helmut Bellingrodt
 Antonio Navarro Wolff
 Carlos Lemos Simmonds
 Jacquin Strouss Lucena
 Leopoldo Rother
 Marino Klinger
 Roberto Gerlein
 Carlos Lehder

Diplomatic locations 

 Germany has an Embassy in Bogotá.
 Colombia has an Embassy in Berlin and a consulate general in Frankfurt am Main.

References

External links 

 Information from the German Foreign Office on relations with Colombia

 
Germany
Bilateral relations of Germany